Chris Gifford (born May 3, 1959) is an American writer and executive producer at Nickelodeon. He co-created the Peabody Award-winning children's series Dora the Explorer and its spin-offs Go, Diego, Go!, and Dora and Friends: Into the City!, and was the voice of the shows' Big Red Chicken, the Grumpy Old Troll, the Pirate Captain Pig, etc. He was a cast member (Danny) on the 1980s syndicated children's series The Great Space Coaster.

Gifford attended the Browning School and is a resident of Montclair, New Jersey.

References

American television writers
American male television writers
People from Montclair, New Jersey
Living people
American male voice actors
American voice directors
Screenwriters from New Jersey
Browning School alumni
Year of birth missing (living people)
Connecticut College alumni
Television producers from New Jersey